Carnival Art was an American alternative rock band. Formed in Los Angeles in 1989, the band in the beginning consisted of Michael Petak (lead vocals, guitar), Shane Paul Rhody (guitar, vocals), Ed Dobrydnio (bass guitar), and Keith Fallis (drums, vocals). They released their debut album, titled Like Nobody's Business, exclusively on vinyl through their own record label Spineless Voodoo Records the same year. After this album, Rhody exited the band, with Dobrydnio replacing him on guitar and Brian Bell joining the band to assume bass duties.

In 1990, the band released a promotional EP titled Dig, followed by their second full-length studio album, Thrumdrone, released a year later on Situation Two Records, along with an EP titled Blue Food & Black Sparks. A stopgap EP titled Holy Smokes was released in 1992, and contained a cover of "Feel Like Makin' Love" by Bad Company. The band was moved to Beggars Banquet Records after Situation Two dissolved the same year, and they then released their third and final studio album Welcome to Vas Llegas that year as well. The band also recorded a cover of "Cold Ethyl" for an Alice Cooper tribute album titled Welcome to Our Nightmare: A Tribute to Alice Cooper, released in 1993 on Triple X Records.

Their lack of commercial success ultimately led to them being dropped from Beggars Banquet Records, and after an unsuccessful attempt at landing another record deal under the name Jerkwater, the band broke up altogether. Following the break-up, Bell formed a duo with his then-girlfriend, Susan Fox, called the Space Twins, and then became the rhythm guitarist for Weezer. Petak recorded a solo album titled Pretty Little Lonely, and Fallis became the drummer for Big Drill Car. The song "Mr. Blue Veins", from the album Thrumdrone, was featured in the episode "Water Safety" from the MTV animated series Beavis and Butt-head.

Band members 
 Michael Petak - lead vocals, guitar (1989-1993)
 Shane Paul Rhody - lead guitar, vocals (1989-1990)
 Ed Dobrydnio - bass guitar (1989-1990), lead guitar, vocals (1990-1993)
 Brian Bell - bass guitar, vocals (1990-1993)
 Keith Fallis - drums, vocals (1989-1993)

Discography

Studio albums

EPs

Appearances

References

External links 
 Carnival Art discography at Discogs

Alternative rock groups from California
Situation Two artists
Beggars Banquet Records artists
Musical quartets
Musical groups from Los Angeles